Pooneh Hajimohammadi is an Iranian stage, television and film actress who has appeared in films and television in Iran and the United Kingdom.

Biography
Hajimohammadi was born in Iran and began her career in Iran in TV shows including Khane Dar Tariki and Mazrae Kochak, and the feature film Aroosak Farangi.

After moving to the U.K. she appeared in The Bill, The Machine and Words with Gods.

Filmography

Film

References

External links

Year of birth missing (living people)
Living people
Soore University alumni
Iranian film actresses
Iranian stage actresses
Iranian television actresses
21st-century Iranian actresses
Iranian expatriates in the United Kingdom